Keith M. Davidson is an attorney in Beverly Hills, California. Davidson has represented clients who sought nondisclosure agreement settlements from notable individuals, including Donald Trump, Charlie Sheen, and Hulk Hogan. He has also managed professional boxers Manny Pacquiao and James Toney.

In the mid-2010s, adult film actress Stormy Daniels and Playboy Playmate Karen McDougal retained Davidson to negotiate payments in exchange for refraining from publicly discussing their sexual encounters with then-presidential candidate Donald Trump. These settlements drew Davidson into the Trump campaign expense controversy. He has since cooperated with special prosecutor Robert Mueller's investigation.

Early life
Davidson was born and raised in Brockton, Massachusetts, a suburb of Boston that calls itself the "City of Champions" since title-winning boxers Rocky Marciano and Marvin Hagler were natives. Davidson graduated from Boston College with a B.S. in economics in 1993. For the next two years, Davidson worked in government with the state legislature and at the Plymouth County district attorney's office. He then attended Whittier Law School in Costa Mesa, California, graduated in May 2000, and sworn in to the bar on December 5, 2000.

Career
Davidson has settled cases for sums up to $1.6 million. He has represented clients in criminal and civil matters, including personal injury cases, contract disputes, and entertainment law. In 2003 and again in 2012, Davidson represented children abused by a kindergarten teacher.

In the mid-2010s, adult film actress Stormy Daniels and Playboy Playmate Karen McDougal retained Davidson to negotiate payments in exchange for not publicly discussing their sexual encounters with Donald Trump; Daniels accepted $130,000 in November 2016, shortly before Trump was elected U.S. president, in return for signing an NDA.

In 2016, Davidson negotiated a settlement of $1.6 million for Playboy Playmate Shera Bechard from an unnamed Republican Party official.

In additional to practicing law, Davidson managed boxers James Toney and Manny Pacquiao, often visible at the latter's side when he went out in public.

Paris Hilton 
In January 2007, the website ParisExposed.com launched, offering unrestricted access to digitized copies of Paris Hilton's diaries, nude photos, videos, and medical and financial records for a fee. The materials were originally acquired in a 2005 Public Storage auction, after Hilton had failed to pay. Hilton's lawyers sued in federal court; a month later, the court granted an injunction barring further publication and dissemination of the material. ParisExposed.com reappeared four months later. Hilton's attorney's sued again, naming as the defendant the St. Kitts-based shell company who registered the domain. As the attorney for the shell company, Davidson told The Smoking Gun that, while he represented the content owner, that was the extent of his involvement with the site.

Tila Tequila 
In 2010, Tila Tequila alleged that Davidson threatened to market a sex tape of her and her former boyfriend, claiming that she would receive a share of the proceeds if she consented to its release. However, Tequila had no interest in the videos distribution.

Davidson quickly settled with her and offered to give her the tape as long as the settlement absolved him of professional wrongdoing. While he was vague about how he had acquired the copyright, he defended his actions in The Smoking Gun article. "... [I] was willing to give it back to her for nothing... I thought that it was probably an admirable thing to do and a way to get rid of the whole case."

Charlie Sheen 
In 2010, Capri Anderson alleged that she was assaulted by Charlie Sheen and retained Davidson as council. Despite his 90-day suspension, Davidson contacted Sheen's attorney to negotiate a settlement of at least a million dollars. Sheen later sued Anderson, arguing she was attempting to extort him. Davidson arranged for Anderson to appear on Good Morning America to discuss her case and appeared with her on the broadcast interview.

The following year Davidson represented Kira Montgomery, another adult-film actress who claimed potential injury from Sheen. In 2011, Sheen disclosed to Montgomery that he was HIV-positive (she would later test negative). Montgomery was referred to Davidson.

During their first meeting, Montgomery's partner, claimed Kira was under the influence of the methamphetamines when she signed her contract with Davidson, thus voiding it. Davidson disputed the account. Davidson arranged for Montgomery to enter a rehabilitation facility, and eventually negotiated a $2 million settlement with Sheen, payable in installments pending she kept the actor's HIV status to herself. Sheen finally went public with his HIV status in 2015, ending his settlement obligations. The day before, Davidson registered the domain charliesheenlawsuit.com.

Hulk Hogan 
In early 2012, TMZ reported the discovery of a sex tape featuring former professional wrestler Hulk Hogan and radio personality Todd Clem's wife. The videos had been given to TMZ by Matt Loyd, a former intern for Clem's radio show. Loyd claimed he had found the tapes inside a box set of DVDs during a garage sale fundraiser Clem had held. Law enforcement later believed the DVDs had been stolen, but never pressed charges.

TMZ was not planning to air any excerpts from the tapes. However, in October 2012, the website Gawker published a short excerpt of the tape and a description of the rest. At that time, TMZ recommended that Loyd retain Davidson. Davidson quickly approached Hogan's attorney, David Houston, to negotiate an agreement to return the tapes to Hogan. Davidson characterized the Gawker post as a "shot across the bow" from his clients, saying that there was more where that had come from, and made what Houston characterized as less discreet threats.

Hogan, Houston, and Davidson met in a Florida hotel room to finalize the agreement. Davidson brought the videos, and the other two brought $150,000 in cash. FBI agents in the next room listened in and prepared to make an arrest. During the meeting, Davidson admitted to Houston that the tapes had initially come from a disgruntled former employee of Clem's and that he did not know whether they had been stolen nor was he interested in knowing.

During the meeting, Lori Burbridge (a friend of Loyd's) admitted to Hogan and Houston that she had leaked the tape to Gawker. She and Hogan signed multiple copies of the agreement. While Houston and Hogan were authenticating them, Burbridge submitted to a lie detector test as the contract required. Davidson prepared to hand over the DVDs, and Houston readied a check for $150,000 when the FBI agents entered the room.

After being detained and questioned, Burbridge and Davidson were released, pending further investigation. Davidson texted Loyd and advised him to retain separate counsel since he now had a conflict of interest as a target of the same investigation. Davidson hired A. Brian Albritton, former United States Attorney for the Middle District of Florida to represent him. Seven months later, federal prosecutors closed the case without charging anyone.

In 2015, a portion of the video in which Hogan had used racist language was made public by The National Enquirer. Hogan sued Gawker, with the help of tech billionaire Peter Thiel. The lawsuit forced Gawker into bankruptcy, and they subsequently had to shut down. Hogan also sued Davidson, Loyd, Burbridge, and several others connected to Gawker, alleging they conspired with Gawker to persuade Hogan to drop his suit and conspired to leak and financially benefit from illegally recorded video.

Karen McDougal 
From 2006 to 2007, Karen McDougal, Playboys 1998 Playmate of the Year, had an affair with Donald Trump. A decade later, just after Trump won the 2016 Republican nomination for president, another former Playmate, Carrie Stevens named McDougal and several other Playmates who had had affairs with Donald Trump, on her Twitter feed. McDougal had no intention of publicly sharing the details of the affair; however, a friend urged her to, "get out in front of it," so she hired Davidson to negotiate her story with interested media outlets.

McDougal retained Davidson in June 2016, agreeing that he would get 45 percent of any monies she received in connection with the story. Davidson began negotiating with American Media, Inc. (AMI), the parent company of The National Enquirer. AMI, executive Dylan Howard had McDougal explain the details of the affair. Afterward Davidson told her that the company was not interested. McDougal later learned that Davidson had called Michael Cohen, one of Trump's lawyers, about her conversation with AMI; Davidson called it "a professional courtesy."

McDougal looked for other media outlets to tell the story first; ABC News expressed interest. She shared documents with them, but AMI contacted her with renewed interest. They offered to pay her for the lifetime rights to the story but stated they would not publish it since the company's CEO David J. Pecker was a personal friend of Trump. The offer included a cash payment of $150,000, two years of columns on women's health and wellness, and two cover appearances on their magazines. McDougal claims she made it clear that she did not fully understand the contract; however, Davidson allegedly recommended that she sign and return the agreement within hours of receipt. Upon later review, McDougal discovered that the deal only gave AMI the option to run columns under her name and likeness, a detail she claims Davidson did not adequately communicate with her. Davidson said he had, "fulfilled his obligations and zealously advocated for Ms. McDougal to accomplish her stated goals at that time."

Shortly before the election, at the beginning of November, The Wall Street Journal reported on the deal between AMI and McDougal and the alleged affair. AMI contacted McDougal again, saying that their goal had always been to make sure the story was never published. McDougal fired Davidson and hired another attorney to void the AMI contract; in April 2018, she was successful.

Stormy Daniels 

Around the same time that Davidson was finalizing the deal between McDougal and AMI, he was representing another woman who alleged a contemporaneous affair with Trump: adult-film actress Stephanie Clifford, known onscreen as Stormy Daniels. In that case, the counterparty was Trump himself, represented by Cohen. Davidson told CNN he had first represented Clifford in this matter when gossip site TheDirty.com reported rumors of the relationship in 2011. Ultimately Daniels received $130,000 for her silence.

In early 2018, Daniels broke her silence and recounted the affair to Anderson Cooper on 60 Minutes. By then, she had fired Davidson; her new lawyer, Michael Avenatti, charged that Davidson had colluded with Cohen both in Daniels' and McDougal's cases to protect Trump. In June, Daniels sued Davidson for malpractice; two days later, Davidson countersued her and Avenatti alleging defamation. He said that her claims were inaccurate and that he looked forward to correcting them, "in an appropriate forum."

Davidson's involvement with Daniels' settlement interested special prosecutor Robert Mueller, who was investigating the payment. Cohen made the payment personally through a limited liability corporation; however, it was suggested he was to be reimbursed by Trump personally or by his campaign, a payment which was not reported as a campaign expense. After the FBI searched Cohen's office in mid-April 2018, prosecutors asked Davidson to turn over, "certain electronic records" from his interactions with Cohen.

In a March 11, 2019 interview on CNN's Cuomo Prime Time, Davidson stated that he had cooperated with federal prosecutors at the Southern District of New York. They were investigating a potential Campaign Finance Violation by Donald Trump over the payment. Davidson sat for roughly 20 hours of interviews with the DOJ.  In response to this disclosure, Asha Rangappa stated that Davidson was an essential independent corroborating witness for the prosecution because he verified that Stormy Daniels was paid for political purposes, at least in part.

Shera Bechard 
In May 2018, The Wall Street Journal reported that Shera Bechard, another former Playmate, had retained Davidson to negotiate for her a $1.6 million payment from an unnamed Republican Party official. According to a nondisclosure agreement found among documents seized in the raid on Michael Cohen's office the previous month, the money was for an affair that had led to an abortion. The agreement had been signed "David Dennison," for Cohen's client, the same pseudonym that Trump had used to sign his agreement with Daniels while Davidson had represented her. The Journal later identified the official as Elliott Broidy, the Republican party's deputy finance chairman, a financier convicted of bribery in 2009. According to the Journals account, after Bechard retained Davidson, he contacted Cohen.

New York magazine columnist Paul Campos suspected that, based on the timing of the arrangement, Broidy may have accepted responsibility for Trump. Campos believed it was much more plausible that it was Trump who had impregnated Bechard and paid to keep the abortion from becoming public knowledge. Campos noted that the first of eight $200,000 installments had been paid to Davidson in early December 2017, just before Bechard fired Davidson, believing he was putting the opposing client's interest above hers.

In July 2018, Broidy announced he was ceasing payments, claiming that the agreement was no longer valid because Davidson had leaked the information to Michael Avenatti, a claim Davidson denied. Campos said this, too, makes no sense as the unauthorized disclosure of the information would not be legal grounds to void the entire agreement; if that had happened, Broidy should have sued Davidson, since he had not represented Bechard since the agreement was signed.

Controversies

Davidson settled a legal malpractice case brought by a woman who claimed Davidson had lost interest in her case when he learned her injuries were not as severe as originally believed and thus would not have earned him a high contingency fee. A couple suing the state over an injury their son received at a state mental hospital learned that Davidson's repeated failure to appear on their behalf had led the judge to dismiss their case. These cases resulted in three complaints against Davidson to the state bar. In 2010, Davidson accepted culpability for incompetence in the practice of law and willful violations of professional rules, including mishandling client funds and failure to keep a client informed of the progress of their case. He was suspended from practicing law for two years, to be followed by three years' probation requiring attendance at an ethics class and regular updates from other lawyers. However, after other lawyers filed letters of their own with the bar noting his lack of prior misconduct and "overall honesty," that suspension was reduced to 90 days. Davidson says that the neglected cases that led to the suspension were the result of being, "spread a little too thin."

Davidson has been sued by three individuals alleging extortion. During negotiations over Hulk Hogan's sex tape in 2012, he was detained by FBI agents conducting a sting operation, although no charges were filed.

Personal life

Davidson's wife, Kristi, is a registered nurse. Davidson and his wife own a house in Studio City, and a vacation home in Scottsdale, Arizona. They have two sons and live in Ventura County, north of Los Angeles. He is an avid golfer.

See also
2017–18 United States political sexual scandals
List of Boston College people
Legal affairs of Donald Trump

References

External links
Keith M. Davidson & Associates website

1971 births
Living people
California lawyers
Criminal defense lawyers
21st-century American lawyers
American boxing managers
Donald Trump litigation
Morrissey College of Arts & Sciences alumni
Whittier Law School alumni
American people of Irish descent
People from Brockton, Massachusetts
People from Beverly Hills, California
People from Ventura County, California